Yashwantrao Chavan Natya Gruha  is a theatre auditorium and exhibition hall located in Kothrud, Pune. The theater is named after first Chief Minister of Maharashtra after the division of Bombay State and the fifth Deputy Prime Minister of India Yashwantrao Chavan. It is run by Pune Municipal Corporation and was established in 2000 with the capacity of 900 persons with a parking facilities of 60 four-wheelers and 125 two-wheelers.

References

Theatres in Pune
Culture of Pune
Auditoriums in India